Sélim Azzazi is a French sound editor, producer and director. Best known for his work on Ennemis intérieurs as director, which earned him critical appraisal and recognition including Academy Award for Best Live Action Short Film at the 89th Academy Awards in 2017.

Awards
 Nominated: Academy Award for Best Live Action Short Film -  Ennemis intérieurs

References

External links
 

French film directors
French film producers
Living people
Year of birth missing (living people)